Helga Bîrsan (born 29 June 1928) was a Romanian gymnast. She competed in seven events at the 1952 Summer Olympics.

She is known to be deceased, although the details are not known.

References

External links

1928 births
Year of death missing
Romanian female artistic gymnasts
Olympic gymnasts of Romania
Gymnasts at the 1952 Summer Olympics